Addison is a town in Winston County, Alabama, United States. It incorporated in December 1949. At the 2020 U.S. Census, it had a population of 659, down from 758 in 2010.

Geography
Addison is located at  (34.200042, -87.177851).

Demographics

Addison first appeared as an incorporated town on the 1950 U.S. Census. It was also the same name as its precinct/census division, which preceded it in reporting on the census since 1910 (See Addison Precinct below).

As of the 2010 Census Addison had a population of 757.  The population was 99.1% white, 0.1% black or African American, 0.1% Asian, 0.7% from two or more races and 0.4% Hispanic or Latino of any race.

As of the census of 2000, there were 723 people, 315 households, and 219 families residing in the town. The racial makeup of the town was 99.45% White, 0.14% Black or African American, 0.14% Native American, 0.14% Asian, and 0.14% from two or more races. 0.14% of the population were Hispanic or Latino of any race.

There were 315 households, out of which 30.2% had children under the age of 18 living with them, 54.0% were married couples living together, 12.1% had a female householder with no husband present, and 30.2% were non-families. 28.6% of all households were made up of individuals, and 13.0% had someone living alone who was 65 years of age or older. The average household size was 2.30 and the average family size was 2.78.

In the town, the population was spread out, with 22.1% under the age of 18, 8.4% from 18 to 24, 30.2% from 25 to 44, 24.9% from 45 to 64, and 14.4% who were 65 years of age or older. The median age was 38 years. For every 100 females, there were 93.3 males. For every 100 females age 18 and over, there were 84.0 males.

The median income for a household in the town was $22,235, and the median income for a family was $31,146. Males had a median income of $26,667 versus $19,583 for females. The per capita income for the town was $12,973. About 16.3% of families and 19.7% of the population were below the poverty line, including 31.1% of those under age 18 and 19.5% of those age 65 or over.

Addison's major industry has been the mobile home industry since the 1960s. It is the home of Cavalier Homes and Southern Energy. More people work in Addison than live in the community.

Addison Precinct/Division (1910-)

Addison Census Division, the former 7th precinct of Winston County, first appeared on the 1910 U.S. Census. The prior precinct/beat name from 1870-1900 (none reported in 1880) was Looney's Tavern. In 1960, Addison precinct was changed to census division as part of a general reorganization of counties.

Addison High School
Addison is home to Addison High School, a member of the Winston County School System. The athletic teams of the school are nicknamed the Bulldogs. Addison had the most successful sports program in class 1-A in 2005 winning state championships in football and volleyball.

The school has had a competitive football team since coach A.G. Hicks came to Addison in the mid-1950s starting a tradition of teams known for great defense.  In 1970 Addison won the state championship, going 13-0, and allowing only one touchdown to be scored against its defense. In 1976 the Bulldogs won their second state football championship under head coach Allen Stephenson. Randy White led the Bulldogs to a third championship in 2005.

The volleyball program, under coach Pam Wilkins, won three straight state championships from 2003 to 2005, and was undefeated in 2005. The varsity girls' volleyball program won a 2A state championship in 2009, after being 2A runner-up in 2008. They also won the state volleyball championship for 1A for 2010. The girls won another state championship under Pam Wilkins in 2013. The girls' softball program, led by coach Debbie Thompson, won a state championship in 1996.

Climate

Notable people
Pat Buttram, movie and television actor, born in Addison
Kip Box, administrative bishop and member of the International Council of Eighteen in the Church of God (Cleveland, Tennessee)

Photo Gallery

References

External links
 Best Small Towns in Alabama DigitalAlabama.com - Your Not So Ordinary Guide To Alabama.
 Addison is covered by the Northwest Alabamian Newspaper.

Towns in Alabama
Towns in Winston County, Alabama